Darko Nejašmić (born 25 January 1999) is a Croatian professional footballer who plays for NK Osijek as a midfielder.

Club career
Born in Split, Nejašmić represented the academy of local Adriatic Split as a youth, before moving on to the youth team of Hajduk Split. In 2017, he was promoted to the reserve team and played regularly during the season. On 20 September 2017, he made his first team debut, coming on as a substitute for Josip Radošević in a 3–0 victory over Oriolik in Croatian Cup.

On 18 June 2018, Nejašmić was promoted to the senior team and signed his first professional contract. He made his league debut on 1 December, playing the whole ninety minutes of a 4–1 victory over Rudeš.

On 6 May 2022, Osijek signed him permanently on a three-year contract.

International career
On 2 October 2018, Nejašmić was called to the under-21 national team for 2019 UEFA European Under-21 Championship qualification matches against Italy and San Marino.

Career statistics

References

External links
 
 Darko Nejašmić at Hajduk Split website

1999 births
Living people
Footballers from Split, Croatia
Association football midfielders
Croatian footballers
Croatia youth international footballers
Croatia under-21 international footballers
HNK Hajduk Split players
HNK Hajduk Split II players
NK Osijek players
Croatian Football League players
First Football League (Croatia) players